General Chase is a signal in the Royal Navy’s lexicon of fleet orders. General Chase may also refer to:

George Francis Chase (1848–1925), U.S. Army Inspector General 
Harold W. Chase (1922–1982), U.S. Marine Corps Reserve major general
John Chase (general) (1856–1918), Colorado National Guard adjudant general
Levi R. Chase (1917–1994), U.S. Air Force major general
William C. Chase (1895–1986), U.S. Army major general
William Henry Chase (1798–1870), Florida Militia major general

See also
David Hendrik Chassé (1765–1849), United Kingdom of the Netherlands lieutenant general